Gideon Gechtman (1942 – November 27, 2008) was an Israeli artist and sculptor. His art is most noted for holding a dialogue with death, often in relation with his own biography.

Biography
Gideon Gechtman was born in Alexandria, Egypt. He moved to the British mandate of Palestine with his family in 1945. He studied at the Avni Institute of Art and Design (1961–1962), Hammersmith College of Art (1968–1971), the Ealing School of Art, and Tel Aviv University (1975–1976).

After returning from London with his future wife singer/actress Bat-Sheva Zeisler, he created minimalistic art that was typical for that period. These works were described to "didactically demonstrate structural and figurative change in material and appearance." Gechtman taught at the Bezalel Academy of Art and Design in Jerusalem (1972–1975) and the Art Teachers Training College of Beit Berl Academic College (1971–2008).

In 1973 Gechtman had his first solo exhibition in the Yodfat Gallery in Tel Aviv. The exhibition, named "Exposure", signified Gechtman's increasing interest in the connection between art and the biographic dimension. On the walls of the gallery were enlarged photographs of the body shaving process before the open heart surgery that Gechtman underwent in 1973. Also in this exhibition were real and fabricated documents regarding Gechtman's medical condition. At the closure of the exhibition Gechtman put up obituaries for himself in Israeli dailies Haaretz and the Jerusalem Post, as well as around his home in Rishon LeZion. Gechtman told later about the reactions: "Teachers from Bezalel said to me: 'Have you gone mad? You frightened everyone.'" The obituaries were a returning element in Gechtman's art for years to come.

In 1999, he exhibited a remodelled hospital environment under the name Yotam, named after his son who had died.

Gideon Gechtman died of heart failure on November 27, 2008.

Gallery

Education
 1961-62 Avni Institute, Tel Aviv
 1962-63 Ealing School of Art, London
 1968-70 Hammersmith College of Art, London
 1975-76 Tel Aviv University, philosophy and art history

Prizes
 1970 – Royal Academy, London
 1989 – Ministry of Education Prize for Completion of Project
 1990 – Histadrut Prize
 1993 – Minister of Science and Arts Prize for Creations in the Realm of Plastic Arts
 1995 – Tel Aviv Museum of Art Prize
 1997 – Israel Discount Bank Prize for an Israeli Artist, Israel Museum, Jerusalem
 1999 – George and Janet Geffin Prize for Excellence in Plastic Arts, America Israel Cultural Foundation
 2002 – Haifa Museum Award for Art for distinguished achievement in contemporary creative arts
 2006 – Ministry of culture prize for his life's work.

Solo exhibitions
 1973 – Exposure, Yodfat Gallery, Tel Aviv
 1984 – Givon Art Gallery, Tel Aviv
 1985 – Mitot, Kibbutz Gallery, Tel Aviv
 1988 – Preparation for Mausoleum No.1, Artists Studios, Jerusalem
 1992 – Israel Echo, Bograshov Gallery, Tel Aviv
 1996 – Chedva, Chelouche Gallery, Tel Aviv
 1999 – Yotam, Herzliya Museum of Art
 2001 – Etude, Chelouche Gallery, Tel Aviv
 2001 – Infinite Regress, Wiensowski & Harbord, Berlin
 2003 – Chedva, Gideon and all the Rest, Artists House, Tel Aviv
 2003 – Haifa Museum of Art, Haifa
 2007 – Initial Concept, Petah Tikva Museum of Art
 2007 – Dead Line, Beit Kanner Municipal Gallery, Rishon Lezion
 2008 – Launching Apparatus, Chelouche Gallery, Tel Aviv
 2012 – Butterflies & Pyramids, Chelouche Gallery, Tel Aviv
 2013 – Gideon Gechtman, 1942–2008, Israel Museum, Jerusalem

References

External links

Museums and galleries
 Gideon Gechtman at Chelouche Gallery
 
 Gideon Gechtman at Petach Tikva Museum of Art

General art websites
 Gideon Gechtman at Artfacts.net
 

1942 births
2008 deaths
Egyptian emigrants to Israel
Egyptian Jews
Israeli Jews
Israeli photographers
Jews in Mandatory Palestine
People from Alexandria
People from Rishon LeZion
20th-century Israeli sculptors
20th-century Israeli painters
21st-century Israeli sculptors
21st-century Israeli painters
Academic staff of Beit Berl College